Baths and wash houses available for public use in Britain were first established in Liverpool. St. George's Pier Head salt-water baths were opened in 1828 by the Corporation of Liverpool, with the first known warm fresh-water public wash house being opened in May 1842 on Frederick Street. Wash houses often combined aspects of public bathing and self-service laundry. The Romans, whom the Victorians often sought to emulate, had built many public baths (thermae) open to everyone, but these had long disappeared. For centuries Bath, Somerset, had retained its popularity as a health resort, while during the Georgian era and particularly after the development of the railway, entrepreneurs developed spa towns around the country, catering first to the aristocracy and then to the growing middle class. These commercial endeavours offered nothing for the working poor.

The popularity of wash-houses was spurred by the newspaper interest in Kitty Wilkinson, an Irish immigrant "wife of a labourer" who became known as the Saint of the Slums. In 1832, during a cholera epidemic, Wilkinson took the initiative to offer the use of her house and yard to neighbours to wash their clothes, at a charge of a penny per week, and showed them how to use a chloride of lime (bleach) to get them clean. She was supported by the District Provident Society and William Rathbone. In 1842 Wilkinson was appointed baths superintendent.

Regulation
In 1844, the Committee for Promoting the Establishment of Baths and Wash-Houses for the Labouring Classes was formed with the Bishop of London as president. The Bishop petitioned for a bill for the regulation of public baths and in 1846 Sir George Gray introduced the bill which became the 1846 Public Baths and Wash-houses Act. This was the first legislation to empower British local authorities to fund the building of public baths and wash houses.

The Act was intended to encourage cities to voluntarily build such facilities and was not mandatory. Manchester, for example, did not adopt the Act until 1876; in the following year, it purchased two large, privately owned, facilities. By the late 19th century, the city had 30 bath houses.

London baths
The first London public baths was opened at Goulston Square, Whitechapel, in 1847 with the Prince consort laying the foundation stone. The building was demolished in 1989 and the site re-used to build the Women's Library in 2001, which incorporates a faux wash house frontage (Facadism). A reasonably well-preserved bath house can be found in the Bathway Quarter in Woolwich, south east London.

Timelines

Other bath and wash houses:
The Wells and Campden Baths and Wash Houses 1888–1978, Hampstead Heath.

See also 
 Birmingham Baths Committee
 Self-service laundry
 Washerwoman

References

Bibliography

External links

 
Laundry places
Waterborne diseases